A majority decision (MD) is a winning criterion in several full-contact combat sports, such as boxing, kickboxing, Muay Thai, mixed martial arts and others sports involving striking. In a majority decision, two of the three judges agree on which fighter won the match, while the third judge indicates that neither fighter won (i.e., a "draw").

In boxing, each of the three judges allocates a score (round by round) for each fighter. If all scheduled rounds are completed (i.e., no knockout (technical included)), each judge totals the points for all rounds. If the same fighter scores more points than the other on two of the judges' scorecards, but the third judge scored equally for both fighters (a draw), the official victory is awarded to the agreed-upon (by a 2 to 1 'majority') fighter. If all judges rule for the same boxer, the decision is referred to as a unanimous decision.  

The majority decision is frequently confused with the term split decision, but they are not the same. A split decision occurs when two judges pick the same fighter as the winner, while the third judge decides that the opposite fighter won.  On very rare occasions, two judges vote for a draw while the third chooses a winner—this is a majority draw.

Notable examples

References

Boxing rules and regulations